Whaleyville Historic District is a national historic district located at Suffolk, Virginia. The district encompasses 103 contributing buildings in the African-American community of Whaleyville in Suffolk.  The district includes eight residences, two churches, two school structures, a train depot, a lodge, an outbuilding, and five commercial structures.  They are in a variety of vernacular and popular turn-of-the 20th century architectural styles including Queen Anne and Bungalow.  Notable buildings include the St. Stephens Holiness Church, Mineral Spring Baptist Church, Odd Fellows Lodge, McAlister Masonic Lodge, Bank of Whaleyville, and the Whaleyville Store.

It was added to the National Register of Historic Places in 1995.

References

African-American history of Virginia
Historic districts on the National Register of Historic Places in Virginia
Queen Anne architecture in Virginia
Buildings and structures in Suffolk, Virginia
National Register of Historic Places in Suffolk, Virginia